Trichembola is a genus of moths in the family Gelechiidae.

Species
 Trichembola epichorda Meyrick, 1918
 Trichembola fuscata Meyrick, 1918
 Trichembola idiarcha Meyrick, 1931
 Trichembola opisthopa Meyrick, 1918
 Trichembola oreia Ghesquière, 1940
 Trichembola palynata Ghesquière, 1940
 Trichembola unimaculata Omelko & Omelko, 1993
 Trichembola segnis Meyrick, 1918

References

 
Gelechiinae